Chalcheraneh (also Romanized as Chālcherāneh; also known as Chel Charāneh) is a village in Poshtkuh-e Mugui Rural District, in the Central District of Fereydunshahr County, Isfahan Province, Iran. At the 2006 census, its population was 70, in 17 families.

References 

Populated places in Fereydunshahr County